Sillers is a surname. Notable people with the surname include:

Tia Sillers, American songwriter
Walter Sillers, American lawyer
Walter Sillers Jr. (1888–1966), American lawyer and politician
Florence Sillers Ogden, American columnist and segregationist
Florence Warfield Sillers, American historian and socialite

See also
Siller